Sakin Bozkurt (born 2 August 1967), known by his stage name DJ Sakin, is a Turkish-German trance music producer.

DJ Sakin & Friends
In 1999, DJ Sakin broke into the mainstream charts with hit single "Protect Your Mind (For the Love of a Princess)".  Following the success of this single, collaborations followed under the name with vocalists and artists as diverse as Vanessa-Mae among others.

Discography

Studio albums

Singles

References

External links
 —DJ Sakin's MySpace page
 —DJ Sakin at Feiyr
 —DJ Sakin at Discogs
 —DJ Sakin at Allmusic

Living people
1967 births